Hindu Vidyapith, informally known as 'CCHV' and also known as 'Chittaranjan Colony Hindu Vidyapith') is a co-educational higher secondary school in Rajarhat, Kolkata, West Bengal, India.

Admission
The school provides admissions to 14 courses in business, economics, politics, education, philosophy, history, science and languages.

History
The school was established in 1938. Radhikaprossono Banerjee secured 11 katha of land gifted by Radhacharan Chatterjee. Bhupatimohon Sen, Brajeshwar Biswas and Jagdish Chatterjee also played key roles in the establishment of the school. It started as a private school but later was sponsored by the School Education Department, West Bengal Government.

References

High schools and secondary schools in West Bengal
Schools in Kolkata
Educational institutions established in 1938
1938 establishments in India